Paul Patrick Chomnycky, OSBM, (born 19 May 1954) is a bishop of the Ukrainian Catholic Church and the current bishop of the Diocese of Stamford, Connecticut.

Education
Paul Chomnycky was born in Vancouver, Canada, the son of a Ukrainian-immigrant father and Canadian-born mother (both of whom died in 1996), and graduated from the University of British Columbia with a bachelor's degree in Commerce in 1980.  After working as an accountant for two years, he entered the novitate of the Order of St. Basil the Great, working in the Basilian monastery in New York.

On 1 October 1988, he was ordained as a priest of the Order of St. Basil the Great.  Then, he continued with further studies in Philosophy at the University of St. Anselm and the Gregorian University in Rome, receiving a Bachelor's in Sacred Theology in 1990.

Upon his return to Canada, he served briefly as an assistant pastor at Sts. Peter and Paul Church in Mundare, Alberta and St. Basil's, Edmonton. Eventually he would return to both parishes as their pastor in 1997 and 2000 and also served as the pastor of St. Mary's Church in Vancouver from 1994 to 1997. During his tenure as pastor at St. Basil's in Edmonton and St. Paul's in Mundare, he was also the superior of the local Basilian monastery.

Bishop Chomnycky also served as the Director of the Basilian Fathers museum in Mundare, a member of the Provincial Council of the Basilian Fathers of Canada, and a member of the college of consultors of the Edmonton Eparchy. He was appointed Exarch for Ukrainian Catholics in Great Britain on April 5, 2002 and consecrated bishop on June 11, 2002 by Cardinal Lubomyr Husar.

See also

 

Apostolic Exarchate for Ukrainians
 Catholic Church hierarchy
 Catholic Church in the United States
 Historical list of the Catholic bishops of the United States
 List of Catholic bishops of the United States
 Lists of patriarchs, archbishops, and bishops

References

External links
Ukrainian Catholic Eparchy of Stamford Official Site
The Catholic Church in England and Wales news release on the appointment of Paul Chomnycky as Apostolic Exarch for Ukrainians in Great Britain

Episcopal succession

Living people
Canadian members of the Ukrainian Greek Catholic Church
Bishops of the Ukrainian Greek Catholic Church
1954 births
Canadian bishops
Order of Saint Basil the Great
Canadian people of Ukrainian descent
Canadian expatriates in the United States
UBC Sauder School of Business alumni
21st-century Eastern Catholic bishops
American people of Ukrainian descent
Bishops in Connecticut
20th-century Eastern Catholic clergy
Eastern Catholic bishops in the United Kingdom
20th-century American clergy
21st-century American clergy